is a passenger railway station located in the city of Ōtsu, Shiga Prefecture, Japan, operated by the West Japan Railway Company (JR West).

Lines

Station layout
The station consists of two island platforms connected by an elevated station building. The station is staffed.

Platforms

History
The route of the Tōkaidō Main Line passed through Seto in 1889, but no station was built in the village. The Ministry of Communications authorized a station to be built in 1900, but despite petitions by local inhabitants, Ishiyama Station was built instead. After half a century, the route of the Tōkaidō Shinkansen was designed to pass through Seta and in 1960 the government asked local residents to permit a land survey and began steps to secure the required land. However, the local residents refused cooperation unless a station was built as per the 1900 authorization. Seta Station opened on 12 August 1969.

Station numbering was introduced to the station in March 2018 with Seta being assigned station number JR-A26.

Passenger statistics
In fiscal 2019, the station was used by an average of 18,224 passengers (boarding passengers only) in 2019, making it the 26th-busiest station by traffic in the West Japan Railway Company's network.

Surrounding area
Otsu Municipal Seta Kita Junior High School
Kayano Shrine
Otsu City Setakita Elementary School

See also
List of railway stations in Japan

References

External links

JR West official home page

Railway stations in Japan opened in 1969
Railway stations in Shiga Prefecture
Tōkaidō Main Line
Railway stations in Ōtsu